With a City (April 25, 2003 – April 23, 2006) was a thoroughbred horse.  As a foal of 2003, he was a possible contender for the Triple Crown in 2006. However, With a City contracted a mysterious illness at Trackside Louisville on Thursday April 20, 2006.

He was euthanized by lethal injection on Sunday, April 23, 2006 after his condition rapidly deteriorated.

Connections

With a City was owned by Equirace.com., and trained by Michael Maker.  He was ridden by Brice Blanc and bred in Florida by Carl Bowling.

Breeding

His sire was City Zip while his dam was With A Princess.

Races

References

2003 racehorse births
2006 racehorse deaths
Racehorses trained in the United States
Racehorses bred in Florida
Thoroughbred family 4-r